The Robertson Skylark SRX-1 is a five place high performance STOL aircraft designed in the 1950s. It was intended to be operated out of  landing strips with  cruise speeds.

Design
The aircraft was designed by James L. Robertson, son of William B. Robertson, Robertson Aircraft Corporation founder at the age of 27. The aircraft is designed to be stall-proof and spin-proof and is capable of a  minimum flight speed. It was also the first light aircraft in America to be designed to accommodate a turboprop engine.

The Skylark is all metal, with a steel tube internal structure. It incorporates shrouds, flaps, spoilerons, turbulator control, stabilators, elevators, and spinner duct cooling.

Operational history
Test flights were performed by aerobatic pilot Marion Cole. He featured the aircraft as part of his Cole Brothers airshows. The aircraft is able to take off in 100 feet.

Specifications (Robertson Skylark SRX-1)

References

External links
 "Plane Takes Off in 100 Feet. Popular Science, July 1954, p. 60.

1950s United States civil utility aircraft
STOL aircraft
Aircraft first flown in 1955
Single-engine aircraft